Pelseneer can be:

 Pelseneer Island, and islands of Antarctica
 Paul Pelseneer, full name Jean Paul Louis Pelseneer (1863-1945), Belgian malacologist.